Tara Hancherow (born October 30, 1995) is a Canadian pair skater. With partner Wesley Killing, she placed seventh at the 2014 World Junior Championships.

Programs 
(with Killing)

Competitive highlights

With Killing

With Wolfe

With Poulin

References

External links 
 
 

1995 births
Canadian female pair skaters
Living people
Sportspeople from Saskatoon